The striped beakfish (Oplegnathus fasciatus) is a species of marine ray-finned fish, a knifejaw from the family Oplegnathidae. It is native to the north-western Pacific Ocean, though a smattering of records exist from other localities in the eastern Pacific such as Hawaii and Chile. Recently introduced – probably via ballast water – in the central Mediterranean, it is found very rarely from Malta to the northern Adriatic. 

Juvenile members of this species can be found with patches of drifting seaweed. The color pattern consists of light and dark vertical bars from which it derives its name. The species feeds mainly on hard-shelled invertebrates such as crustaceans and molluscs. It is a commercially important species and is also farmed. It is also sought after as a game fish.

Five striped beakfish, of which one remains in captivity, endured more than 2 years in the partially submerged hull of the Japanese boat Sai-shou-maru.

References

Oplegnathidae
Fish of Hawaii
Fish described in 1844